Yang Baibing (9 September 1920 – 15 January 2013) was a Chinese military officer. He was a senior general and political commissar in the Chinese People's Liberation Army and the younger half-brother of Yang Shangkun. Together, the two brothers effectively controlled the PLA from the early 1980s until the early 1990s.

Biography 
Yang was born as Yang Shangzheng in Tongnan, Chongqing, on 9 September 1920. He became a guerrilla fighter in 1937, after Japan invaded China and joined the Chinese Communist Party in March 1938. He graduated from the Military–Political University, the Central Party School, and the "Northern Shaanxi Public School", which trained security and intelligence officers for the Communist Party's Central Social Affairs Department. Many years later, in 1958, he also graduated from the Higher Political Academy of the PLA.

Yang had a long and eventful military career, serving as both battlefield commander and political commissar. He fought in the Second Sino–Japanese War and subsequently in the Chinese Civil War, which led to the victory of the CCP and the establishment of the People's Republic of China in 1949. 

From 1949 until 1966 and the outbreak of the Cultural Revolution, Yang continuously served in the Southwest, and took part in the invasion and conquest of Tibet in 1950–51, as well as the crushing of the 1959 Tibetan Rebellion. In 1960 he became Deputy Director, and in 1964 Director, of the Political Department of the Chengdu Military Region. 

Along with his half-brother Yang Shangkun, Yang Baibing was persecuted during the Cultural Revolution, being arrested, imprisoned and expelled from the Party in November 1966. He remained in prison for almost a decade, until he was released in 1975. In 1978, both Yang brothers made their comeback as allies of Deng Xiaoping. Yang Baibing went on to serve as:

 Director of the Political Department and Deputy Political Commissar of the Beijing Military Region (1978–1985)
 Political Commissar of the Beijing Military Region (1985–1987)
 Director of the PLA General Political Department (1987–1992)
 Secretary–General of the Central Military Commission (1989–1992)
 Full Member of the Politburo (1992–1997)

Together with his brother Yang Shangkun, Yang Baibing played a leading role in crushing the 1989 Tiananmen Square Protests and was a main planner of the actual operations to clear the square and violently suppress all opposition. The PLA 27th Group Army, which arrived from Hebei and killed several hundred protesters, was commanded by his son, Yang Jianhua.

In the early 1990s, Yang was one of many top Chinese officials who pushed for a strategic partnership with Russia, following the collapse of the Soviet Union, despite the fact that just a few years earlier, in the 1980s, the PLA was very active in aiding the Mujahedeen against the Soviets in Afghanistan. Yang himself was very active in coordinating military assistance to the Afghans throughout the 1980s, which eventually included weapons such as heavy machine guns, rocket launchers and anti-aircraft artillery.

Yang died in Beijing on 15 January 2013, at the age of 92.

References

1920 births
2013 deaths
Counter-Japanese Military and Political University alumni
People's Liberation Army generals from Chongqing
Victims of the Cultural Revolution
Members of the 14th Politburo of the Chinese Communist Party
Members of the 13th Central Committee of the Chinese Communist Party
1989 Tiananmen Square protests and massacre
Burials at Babaoshan Revolutionary Cemetery